Plato Freiherr von Ustinov (born Platon Grigoryevich Ustinov, ; 1840–1918) was a Russian-born German citizen and the owner of the Hôtel du Parc (Park Hotel) in Jaffa, Ottoman Empire (now Israel).

Biography
Ustinov was born in Russia, younger brother of Mikhail Grigorievich Ustinov (the Russian consul in Hong Kong), son of Grigori Mikhailovich Ustinov (1803–1860) and wife Maria Ivanovna Panshina, paternal nephew of Mikhail Mikhailovich Ustinov (1800-1871; the Russian ambassador in Constantinople), paternal grandson of Mikhail Adrianovich Ustinov (1755–1836), a millionaire merchant from Saratov.

He was a Russian nobleman who held a manor estate in Ustinovka (Устиновка) in today's Balashov Raion. He travelled to the Levant after his doctors recommended its climate to heal his lung disease. The couple earned their livelihood through several enterprises, including a steam mill, a pilgrim hostel, and trading in imported European merchandise. From mid-1861 until early 1862, Ustinov stayed in the Metzlers' hostel, eventually becoming a financial partner in their enterprises. Once his lung disease was completely cured, he returned to Ustinovka, but left the Metzlers a considerable sum of money to enable them to establish a missionary school and an infirmary in Jaffa.

The Metzlers
In May 1862, the Metzlers opened a new infirmary and informed the head of the St. Chrischona Pilgrim missionaries in Riehen, near Basel. The missionaries were very pleased about this progress and sent two deaconesses from the Riehen deaconesses' mother house to serve at the infirmary. Ustinov returned to Jaffa in September 1865 and was pleased with the Metzlers' investment of his funds.

In 1865 and 1866, Metzler broke Ottoman law by giving asylum to a runaway slave woman. After Metzler fulfilled pastoral functions, preaching and holding service, and established a mission in Jaffa, further trouble arose when Samuel Gobat, the Protestant Bishop of Jerusalem, facilitated the placement of Johannes Gruhler (1833–1905), the Anglican priest of Ramle, at the rather Lutheran Jaffa mission. Further, the owners of some local mills sued Metzler in 1868 for the illegal importation of a steam machine.

Metzler treated many sick colonists with George Adams and Abraham McKenzie, who arrived from Maine on 22 September 1866. They founded the American Colony, named Amelican in Arabic and Adams City in English, between today's Rechov Eilat and Rechov haRabbi mi-Bacherach in Tel Aviv-Yafo. The colonists built their wooden houses from prefabricated pieces, which they brought from abroad. However, many of them contracted cholera, and about a third of them died. Many returned to Maine to escape disease, climate, and arbitrary treatment by the Ottoman authorities.

Adams withheld the colonists' money that they had given to him as a common fund before they had left America, so Metzler bought the land of five colonists, providing them with funds for their return to Maine. Metzler later resold one of the houses to the London Society for Promoting Christianity Amongst the Jews. Most settlers did not return to America until 1867.

Protestant conversion
In early 1869, Ustinov asked the Metzlers to join him in Ustinovka, hoping to draw on their management expertise. Metzler then sold much of his real estate on 5 March 1869 to the Templers, a religious group seeking a new home in the Holy Land. The Templers also continued to run the infirmary according to the charitable principles of the Metzlers and Ustinov. Dorothea Metzler died in Ustinovka after a difficult childbirth. While she was on her deathbed, Ustinov promised her that he would marry her daughter Marie, a promise he kept.

Ustinov decided in 1875 to convert to Lutheran Protestantism. He had been baptised as a Russian Orthodox, and being a Russian aristocrat, his conversion would mean losing his estates and status, as all the tsar's Orthodox subjects were forbidden to convert. Ustinov sold his estates to another aristocrat in 1876, before his conversion became known. Queen Olga of Württemberg, herself a Russian Orthodox, arranged for Ustinov to be naturalised in the Kingdom of Württemberg and become a German citizen. His status was confirmed as a Württembergian rank, and he became Freiherr (Baron) von Ustinow.

First marriage
Ustinov married German Marie Metzler in Korntal, Württemberg, on 4 October 1876. They lived in Württemberg for two years before returning to Jaffa, where they bought a mansion in the Colony of the Templers. However, the marriage was very unhappy and the couple divorced in 1888, with costly divorce proceedings between 1881 and 1889.

The mansion that became the Hotel du Parc was originally built for George Adams. This mansion was later acquired by the London Society for Promoting Christianity Amongst the Jews (a Jewish Christian missionary society now known as the Church's Ministry Among Jewish People, or CMJ).

The Temple Society
In June 1874 the Temple Society underwent a schism. Temple leader Georg David Hardegg (1812–1879) and about a third of the Templers seceded from the Society after substantial personal quarrels with the other leader, Christoph Hoffmann. In 1885, the Protestant pastor Carl Schlicht (1855–1930) began to proselytise among the schismatics and succeeded in converting many of them.

Second marriage
On 12 January 1889, Ustinov married Magdalena Hall (1868–1945), who had been born in Magdala on 13 April 1868, the day when British forces took the fortress by storm at the Battle of Magdala, liberating her family and others from captivity in Ethiopia. Her family had later moved to Jaffa. Her father was Moritz Hall (1838–1914), a Jew from Cracow and cannon-caster of Negus Tewodros II of Ethiopia, who was converted to Protestantism by missionaries of the St. Chrischona Pilgrim Mission. Her mother was the Ethiopian court-lady Katharina Hall (1850–1932), also known as Welette-Iyesus, who was of mixed Ethiopian-German origin, the daughter of the German painter Eduard Zander (1813–1868) and court-lady Isette-Werq of Gondar, daughter of an Ethiopian general named Meqado (active before the mid-19th century).

Ustinov and Magdalena Hall had five children. Among them were their eldest son Jona von Ustinov (father of British-Russian actor Peter Ustinov), Tabitha von Ustinow, Peter (Petja) von Ustinow (1895–1917, killed in action in Hollebeke) and Gregory (Grisha, Tich: 1907 Jaffa-1990 Buenos Aires).

Hôtel du Parc
Ustinov employed , an alumnus of the Miqveh Yisra'el agricultural school. ʾElhādīf (1857–1913) bought exotic plants and trees from all over the world in order to develop the garden of Ustinov's hotel into a botanical park.

German Emperor William II, his wife Auguste Victoria, and their closest entourage stayed at the Hôtel du Parc on their visit to Jaffa on 27 October 1898. Their travel agency, Thomas Cook & Son, chose it because they considered it the only establishment in Jaffa suitable for them.

Immanuel Church in Jaffa
The Evangelical congregation of Jaffa in 1889 consisted of former Templers, Protestant German and Swiss expatriates, and proselytes gained earlier by the Metzlers' missionary efforts. Johann Georg Kappus Sr. (1826–1905) became the first chairman of the congregation, later followed by his son Johann Georg Kappus Jr. (1855–1928). Ustinov joined that congregation and offered it the hall of his Hôtel du Parc in Jaffa as a venue for services from 1889 to 1897.

When Jaffa's first pastor, Albert Eugen Schlaich from Korntal, and his wife Luise arrived in Jaffa on 10 March 1897, Ustinov accommodated them in his hotel until they could find an apartment of their own.

On 18 July 1898, Peter Metzler, who then lived in Stuttgart, conveyed his last piece of real estate in Jaffa for the construction of a church to the Evangelical congregation, for which Ustinov paid 10,000 francs, two-thirds of the site's estimated value. When the Evangelical Immanuel Church of Jaffa was finally built and furnished, Ustinov gave it a large crucifix of olive wood.

Ethiopian consulate
Ethiopian Empress Taytu had convinced her adviser Katarina Hall, who had returned without her husband to Ethiopia in 1902, to persuade Ustinov to acquire property near the Ethiopian Church in Jerusalem. The land was purchased in 1910, and construction of a large building began. Ustinov and his family left Palestine in 1913 for Russia, where he died in 1918. His widow Magdalena, who went to live in England and later in Canada, inherited the land in Jerusalem and the partially completed building on it. During a trip to Jerusalem in 1924, she sold the property to the Empress Zewditu I of Ethiopia, who was also visiting there. Zewditu continued the construction on Ustinov's foundations, and it became the Ethiopian consulate. It still exists."

Immanuel House
 
After the end of the British public custodianship of enemy property in Palestine in 1925, Magdalena von Ustinow sold the former mansion in Rechov Auerbach No. 8 to the CMJ in 1926. It is now used as a place of worship, guest house, and heritage centre, called Beit Immanuel (Immanuel House).

Antiquities collection
Ustinov was a major collector of Palestinian antiquities. His collection ended up at the University of Oslo, Norway. Theologian Johannes Pedersen wrote a 1928 book about the collection, Inscriptiones Semiticae collectionis Ustinowianae.

Notes

References

Bibliography
 Eisler, Ejal Jakob (Eyal Ya'aqov Aizler/איל יעקב איזלר), Der deutsche Beitrag zum Aufstieg Jaffas 1850–1914: Zur Geschichte Palästinas im 19. Jahrhundert, Wiesbaden: Harrassowitz, 1997, (Abhandlungen des Deutschen Palästina-Vereins; vol. 22) 
Eisler, Ejal Jakob (איל יעקב איזלר), Peter Martin Metzler (1824–1907): Ein christlicher Missionar im Heiligen Land [פטר מרטין מצלר (1907–1824): סיפורו של מיסיונר נוצרי בארץ-ישראל; German], Haifa: אוניברסיטת חיפה / המכון ע"ש גוטליב שומכר לחקר פעילות העולם הנוצרי בארץ-ישראל במאה ה-19, 1999,(פרסומי המכון ע"ש גוטליב שומכר לחקר פעילות העולם הנוצרי בארץ-ישראל במאה ה-19/Abhandlungen des Gottlieb-Schumacher-Instituts zur Erforschung des christlichen Beitrags zum Wiederaufbau Palästinas im 19. Jahrhundert; vol. 2), 
Perry, Yaron (2003). British Mission to the Jews in Nineteenth-Century Palestine. London: Routledge. 
Vogel, Lester I. (1993). To See a Promised Land. Penn State Press.

Further reading
Pedersen, Johannes (1928), Inscriptiones Semiticae collectionis Ustinowianae, Oslo
Skupinska-Løvset, Ilona (1976), The Ustinov collection: the Palestinian pottery, Oslo: Universitetsforlaget
Frellumstad, Randi (2007), Glass in the Ustinow collection: objects without context? University of Oslo

1840 births
1918 deaths
19th-century German businesspeople
Barons of Germany
Russian nobility
Emigrants from the Russian Empire to Germany
Naturalized citizens of Germany
German people of Russian descent
German hoteliers
Converts to Lutheranism from Eastern Orthodoxy
Former Russian Orthodox Christians
Emigrants from the Russian Empire to the Ottoman Empire
Russian hoteliers
Ustinov family
19th-century Lutherans